"Quiero Estar Contigo" (Eng.: I Want To Be With You) is the second single of Alejandra Guzmán's twelfth studio album Indeleble. The song was produced by Loris Ceroni and written by Mario Domm, Ettore Grenci and Alejandra Guzmán. The song was not as successful as the singer first single "Volverte a Amar", however it managed to peak within the Top Ten in Mexico, where the ringtone of this single was certified gold.

Chart performance

Certification

References 

2006 songs
Alejandra Guzmán songs
Songs written by Mario Domm
Songs written by Alejandra Guzmán